Jass Bajwa is an Indian-Punjabi singer, songwriter and actor. He started his singing career in September 2014 with his album Chakvi Mandeer and made his acting debut in Thug Life released in 2017.

Career

He made his singing debut with the album titled Chakvi Mandeer in the year 2014.

After his debut album, he released multiple singles including "Feem Di Dalli", "Kismat", "Tolla" and "Tera Time" among others. In 2015, he released his second album "Jatt Sauda".

After establishing himself as a singer, he tried his luck in acting and made his acting debut with the Punjabi film Thug Life in 2017. In 2017, he launched various singles like "Nose Pin" and "Dil De Raaje".  His new album Urban Zimidar was also released in the same year. In 2018, he is releasing his fourth album titled as Jatt Nation on 10 November.

Album discography

Singles discography

Filmography

References

External links
 
 

Living people
Year of birth missing (living people)